Ayibobo is a mizik rasin band from New York, New York, USA.  Ayibobo is one spelling of a Haitian Creole word that means "amen" or "hallelujah". However, the majority of mainstream Christian Haitians refrain from using the word Ayibobo as it is more commonly used among Vodou practitioners. Therefore, "Amen" and Hallejujah or "Alelouya", in its creole spelling, are used by mainstream Christians and "Ayibobo" are for those that practice Vodou.

Although the band is from New York, most of the band members are Haitian or Haitian-American, and the musical style of the band adopted was inspired by the mizik rasin movement then being suppressed in Haiti by the military junta of Raoul Cédras.  The band released one album, Freestyle, in 1993.

Discography

References

External links

Haitian musical groups
DIW Records artists